Senator Guess may refer to:

Gretchen Guess (born 1969), Alaska State Senate
Sam C. Guess (1909–1989), Washington State Senate